José Brito (born 19 March 1944) is a Cape Verdean politician.

Biography
Brito was born in Dakar, Senegal (then a French colony) to Cape Verdean parents.  Later in his years, he moved to Cape Verde.

Brito holds a bachelor of science in mathematics and master of sciences in physics and chemistry at the University of Abidjan in the Ivory Coast and a high diploma studies in chemical engineering at the Institut français du pétrole in France.

Brito worked as vice-president of governmental relations for Ocean Energy, Oil Company in Texas, USA from 1992 to 1996.

From 2001 to 2006, he served as Cape Verde's ambassador to the United States, Canada, and Mexico, before taking up the position of Minister of Economy, Growth and Competitiveness from 2006 to 2008.  He was the Minister of Foreign Affairs of the nation of Cape Verde from 2008 to 2011.

See also
Foreign relations of Cape Verde

References

External links
José Brito, a Political Man of a French Speaker (interview in Praia on June 11, 2008) 

Living people
1944 births
Foreign ministers of Cape Verde
Ambassadors of Cape Verde to the United States
Ambassadors of Cape Verde to Canada
Ambassadors of Cape Verde to Mexico
People from Dakar